Steven Jackson (born May 11, 1984 in Columbia, South Carolina) is a former American football fullback. He was signed by the Minnesota Vikings as an undrafted free agent in 2006. He played college football at Clemson.

Jackson has also been a member of the Carolina Panthers, Denver Broncos and Kansas City Chiefs.

College career
Jackson played defensive tackle earning freshman all conference honors at East Tennessee State University before transferring to Clemson.

External links
Carolina Panthers bio

1984 births
Living people
Players of American football from Columbia, South Carolina
American football defensive tackles
American football fullbacks
East Tennessee State Buccaneers football players
Clemson Tigers football players
Minnesota Vikings players
Carolina Panthers players
Denver Broncos players
Kansas City Chiefs players